The Grande Prêmio Brasil is a Group 1 stakes race at Hipódromo da Gávea, at the city of Rio de Janeiro. It's a left-handed flat race, on a turf track, for thoroughbreds three years old and up (3yo+). It's also the main race in the Brazilian racing calendar.

History

The Grand Prêmio Brasil was first run on August 1st, 1933, a Sunday. The race brought together the best Brazilian racehorses of the time, the idea of Linneo de Paula Machado, president of the then newly formed Jockey Club Brasileiro.

The first running was won by the Brazilian-bred Mossoró, sired by Kitchner, foaled at the Pernambuco state, and ridden by Justiniano Mesquita.

Six horses have won the race twice: Albatroz (1943, 1944), Helíaco (1947, 1948), Gualicho (1952, 1953), Zenabre (1965, 1966), Villach King (1991, 1993), and George Washington (2019, 2021). 

The race was first run at a distance of 3000 meters (approximately  miles or 15 furlongs). Since 1972, it has been run at a distance of 2400 meters (approximately 1 miles or 12 furlongs).

In 1959, Narvik set a world record for 3000 meters, winning the Grande Prêmio Brasil in a time of 3:02.

Timeline
1933 – First edition of the G. P. Brasil.
1959 – 3000 meter world record set by Narvik.
2014 – Bal a Bali becomes the first three-year-old winner. First edition to be a part of the Breeders' Cup Challenge series.

Purse

 2020: R$216,869.10 (total); R$38,864.70 (winner)

Race Day

Traditionally ran in the first Sunday of August, its date was changed to June from 2014 on, in order to integrate the race into the calendar of the Breeders' Cup Challenge series, as in 2014 the race began awarding its winner with an automatic berth into the Breeders' Cup Turf.

Records
Speed record:

 2400 meters (current distance): 2:23.93 – L'Amico Steve (2007)
 3000 meters: 3:02 – Narvik (1959)

Most wins: 

 2 – Albatroz (1943, 1944)
 2 – Helíaco (1947, 1948)
 2 – Gualicho (1952, 1953)
 2 – Zenabre (1965, 1966)
 2 – Villach King (1991, 1993)
 2 – George Washington (2019, 2021)

Most wins by a jockey: 

 5 – Juvenal Machado da Silva (1979, 1982, 1986, 1987, 1990)
 3 – Luiz Rigoni (1954, 1970, 1971)
 3 – Dendico Garcia (1964, 1965, 1966)
 3 – Carlos Lavor (1989, 1991, 1993)

Most wins by a trainer: 

 6 – Ernani de Freitas (1939, 1943, 1944, 1947, 1948, 1975)
 6 – Venâncio Nahid (1990, 2005, 2009, 2015, 2016, 2020)
 5 – Dulcino Guignoni (2000, 2001, 2002, 2011, 2014)
 4 – Luis Esteves (2017, 2018, 2019, 2021)

Most wins by an owner: 

 4 – Stud Linneo de Paula Machado (1943, 1944, 1947, 1948)
 4 – Haras Santa Maria de Araras (1989, 1991, 1993, 2013)
 3 – Antenor Lara Campos (1935, 1937, 1940)
 3 – Stud Almeida Prado & Assumpção (1952, 1953, 1960)
 3 – Haras São José e Expedictus (1975, 1979, 1985)
 3 – Haras Santa Ana do Rio Grande (1984, 1987, 1992)

Most wins by a breeder:

 5 – L. de P. Machado (1939, 1943, 1944, 1947, 1948)
 5 – Haras São José e Expedictus (1975, 1979, 1985, 2001, 2008)
 5 – Haras Santa Maria de Araras (1989, 1991, 1993, 2013, 2014)
 3 – Haras Santa Ana do Rio Grande (1987, 1988, 1992)

Winners

† designates a filly or mare

References

Bibliography
 Revista JCB Jockey Club Brasileiro  Nﾟ1348
 TBHeritage : G. P. Brazil

External links

 Results of all the years Grande Prêmio Brasil 

Horse races in Brazil
Breeders' Cup Challenge series